Fénix Club de Rugby is a Spanish rugby team based in Zaragoza.

History
The club was founded in 1982.

External links
Fénix Club de Rugby

Spanish rugby union teams
Rugby clubs established in 1982
1982 establishments in Spain
Sport in Zaragoza
Sports teams in Aragon

an:Fénix Club de Rugby Zaragoza